Aqsa Mahmood is a citizen of the United Kingdom, from Glasgow, who stirred controversy in 2013 when she was one of the first UK women to voluntarily slip into Daesh territory, when she was 20 years old.

Early life
Mahmood was born to Pakistani immigrant parents (her father Muzaffar was the first Pakistani to play cricket for the Scottish cricket team). Mahmood attended Craigholme School and Shawlands Academy in Glasgow.

ISIS
In 2015, her family challenged the allegation that she played a role in recruiting four teenage girls to follow her example.
Her family expressed surprise over her travel to Daesh territory.

In April 2015, Mark Rowley, the Assistant Commissioner for Specialist Operations of the Metropolitan Police Service and the concurrent Chair of the National Police Chiefs' Council Counter-Terrorism Coordination Committee, told the UK House of Commons Home Affairs Committee that security officials were close to compiling enough evidence to charge Mahmood, if she returned to the UK, or to request extradition, if she tried to settle elsewhere.

On 28 September 2015 the United Nations placed her on its sanctions list, reserved for those with ties to Al Qaeda.

UK authorities rescinded her passport, to prevent her return to the United Kingdom.

In February 2019, The Mirror reported that Mahmood was believed to have died in the warzone.

References

1993 births
People from Glasgow
British expatriates in Syria
Scottish people of Pakistani descent
British Islamists
Islamic State of Iraq and the Levant members
Possibly living people
People educated at Shawlands Academy